Ervin Murray Bruner (1915 – 2008) was a member of the Wisconsin State Assembly from Verona and Madison, Wisconsin.

Biography
Bruner was born on November 12, 1915, in Lenoir, North Carolina. He graduated from the University of Wisconsin–Milwaukee, the University of Wisconsin–Madison, and the University of Wisconsin Law School. He practiced law and was a farmer. During World War II, he served in the United States Army. Bruner died on November 24, 2008.

Political career
Bruner was a member of the Assembly from 1955 until his resignation on July 1, 1957, to become a judge of the Dane County, Wisconsin Small Claims Court. He was a Democrat.

References

People from Lenoir, North Carolina
People from Verona, Wisconsin
Democratic Party members of the Wisconsin State Assembly
Wisconsin state court judges
Farmers from Wisconsin
Military personnel from Wisconsin
United States Army soldiers
United States Army personnel of World War II
University of Wisconsin–Milwaukee alumni
University of Wisconsin–Madison alumni
University of Wisconsin Law School alumni
1915 births
2008 deaths
20th-century American judges
Politicians from Madison, Wisconsin
20th-century American politicians